Fire Station No. 14 is a fire station located at 4701 Forty–first Street in Tacoma, Washington. The architect was Morton J. Nicholson and the station was built in 1928 by Martin H. Marker. It was listed on the National Register of Historic Places on May 2, 1986, as part of a thematic group "Historic Fire Stations of Tacoma, Washington.

See also
 Historic preservation
 National Register of Historic Places listings in Pierce County, Washington

References

External links
 

1928 establishments in Washington (state)
Buildings and structures in Tacoma, Washington
Bungalow architecture in Washington (state)
Fire stations completed in 1928
Fire stations on the National Register of Historic Places in Washington (state)
National Register of Historic Places in Tacoma, Washington